Lake Czorsztyn is a man-made reservoir on the Dunajec river, southern Poland, between the Pieniny and the Gorce Mountains. It exists due to a dam in the village of Niedzica.

The dam itself was completed in 1995. Below the dam there is a much smaller Sromowce Lake, which regulates the water level of Czorsztyn Lake.

Main purpose of the reservoir is to prevent floods in the Dunajec river valley. Furthermore, it attracts a growing number of tourists. The dam is equipped with a 92 megawatt power plant. The lake is located in close proximity of several popular tourist spots, such as Pieniny National Park, Niedzica Castle, Czorsztyn Castle, and the tourist village of Kluszkowce. Among villages located by Czorsztyn Lake are Niedzica, Falsztyn, Frydman, Dębno Podhalańskie, Maniowy, Kluszkowce and Czorsztyn.

Sources 
 Andrzej Jagus: Szczawnica i okolice. Szczawnica: Karpatus, 2002. . (pol.)

External links 

 Description of the lake

Czorsztyn
Czorsztyn
Nowy Targ County